Dubovsky or Dubovskoy (both masculine), Dubovskaya (feminine), or Dubovskoye (neuter) is the name of several rural localities in Russia.

Modern localities
Dubovsky, Chuvash Republic, a settlement in Alikovskoye Rural Settlement of Alikovsky District in the Chuvash Republic; 
Dubovsky, Mari El Republic, a settlement in Ardinsky Rural Okrug of Kilemarsky District in the Mari El Republic; 
Dubovsky, Kumylzhensky District, Volgograd Oblast, a khutor in Shakinsky Selsoviet of Kumylzhensky District in Volgograd Oblast
Dubovsky, Uryupinsky District, Volgograd Oblast, a khutor in Dubovsky Selsoviet of Uryupinsky District in Volgograd Oblast
Dubovskoye, Primorsky Krai, a selo in Spassky District of Primorsky Krai
Dubovskoye, Rostov Oblast, a selo in Dubovskoye Rural Settlement of Dubovsky District in Rostov Oblast; 
Dubovskaya, Chechen Republic, a stanitsa in Dubovskaya Rural Administration of Shelkovskoy District in the Chechen Republic
Dubovskaya, Republic of Karelia, a village in Pudozhsky District of the Republic of Karelia

Alternative names
Dubovsky, alternative name of Dubovskaya I, a village in Matvinursky Rural Okrug of Sanchursky District in Kirov Oblast; 
Dubovsky/Dubovskoy, alternative names of Dubovoy, a khutor in Bokovskoye Rural Settlement of Bokovsky District in Rostov Oblast; 
Dubovsky, alternative name of Dubrovsky, a khutor in Dubrovskoye Rural Settlement of Sholokhovsky District in Rostov Oblast;